Johanna ("Ans") Schut (born 26 November 1944) is a former ice speed skater from the Netherlands.

Ans Schut had her best year in 1968 when, after winning silver at the World Allround Championships, she became Olympic Champion on the 3,000 m at the 1968 Winter Olympics in Grenoble. Her time of 4:56.2 (a new Olympic record) was an excellent time those days and she won well ahead of Finnish skater Kaija Mustonen and Dutch compatriot Stien Kaiser, the 3,000 m world record holder at the time.

In 1969, Schut won silver at the European Allround Championships and bronze at the World Allround Championships. That year, she also skated five world records. The next two years, she fell a few times during international championships (although she did manage to win bronze at the World Allround Championships in 1970). In 1971 she ended her speed skating career, got married, and changed her last name to Boekema-Schut. She has three children.

Records
Over the course of her career, Schut skated 5 world records and 8 Dutch records:

Honors 

References

Notes

Bibliography

 Bal, Rien and Van Dijk, Rob. Schaatskampioenen, alles over het seizoen 68–69. Amsterdam: N.V. Het Parool, 1969.
 Bijlsma, Hedman with Tom Dekkers; Arie van Erk; Gé du Maine; Hans Niezen; Nol Terwindt and Karel Verbeek. Schaatsseizoen '96–'97: 25e Jaargang 1996–1997, statistische terugblik. Assen, the Netherlands: Stichting Schaatsseizoen, 1997. ISSN 0922-9582.
 Eng, Trond. All Time International Championships, Complete Results: 1889 – 2002. Askim, Norway: WSSSA-Skøytenytt, 2002.
 Froger, Fred R. Winnaars op de schaats, Een Parool Sportpocket. Amsterdam: N.V. Het Parool, 1968.
 Koomen, Theo. 10 Jaar Topschaatsen. Laren(NH), the Netherlands: Uitgeverij Luitingh, 1971. .
 Kleine, Jan. Schaatsjaarboek 1964. Deventer, the Netherlands, 1964.
 Kleine, Jan. Schaatsjaarboek 1965. Deventer, the Netherlands, 1965.
 Kleine, Jan. Schaatsjaarboek 1966, alles over het hardrijden op de schaats. Amsterdam, Drukkerij Dico, 1966.
 Kleine, Jan. Schaatsjaarboek 1967/68, alles over het hardrijden op de lange baan. Amsterdam, Drukkerij Dico, 1967.
 Kleine, Jan. Schaatsjaarboek 1968/69, alles over het hardrijden op de lange baan. Amsterdam, Drukkerij Dico, 1968.
 Kleine, Jan. Schaatsjaarboek 1969–'70, alles over het hardrijden op de lange baan. Ede, the Netherlands, 1969.
 Kleine, Jan. Schaatsjaarboek 1970–'71, alles over het hardrijden op de lange baan. Nijmegen, the Netherlands, Schaatsjaarboek, 1970.
 Kleine, Jan. Schaatsjaarboek 1971–'72, alles over het hardrijden op de lange baan. Nijmegen, the Netherlands, Schaatsjaarboek, 1971.
 Maaskant, Piet. Flitsende Ijzers, De geschiedenis van de schaatssport. Zwolle, the Netherlands: La Rivière & Voorhoeve, 1967 (2nd revised and extended edition).
 Maaskant, Piet. Heya, Heya! Het nieuwe boek van de Schaatssport. Zwolle, the Netherlands: La Rivière & Voorhoeve, 1970.
 Peereboom, Klaas. Van Jaap Eden tot Ard Schenk. Baarn, the Netherlands: De Boekerij, 1972. .
 Teigen, Magne. Komplette Resultater Internasjonale Mesterskap 1889 – 1989: Menn/Kvinner, Senior/Junior, allround/sprint. Veggli, Norway: WSSSA-Skøytenytt, 1989.
 Van Eyle, Wim. Een Eeuw Nederlandse Schaatssport. Utrecht, the Netherlands: Uitgeverij Het Spectrum, 1982. .

External links
Ans Schut at SkateResults.com

1944 births
Living people
Dutch female speed skaters
Olympic speed skaters of the Netherlands
Speed skaters at the 1968 Winter Olympics
Olympic gold medalists for the Netherlands
Sportspeople from Apeldoorn
Olympic medalists in speed skating
World record setters in speed skating
Medalists at the 1968 Winter Olympics
World Allround Speed Skating Championships medalists
21st-century Dutch women
20th-century Dutch women
20th-century Dutch people